The Queen's Award for Enterprise: Innovation (Technology) (2006) was awarded on 21 April 2006, by Queen Elizabeth II.

Recipients
The following organisations were awarded this year.

 ACO Technologies plc of Shefford, Bedfordshire for ACO Qmax system for surface water management.
 AD Holdings plc of Warrington, Cheshire for the mobile CCTV system TransVu.
 AESSEAL plc of Rotherham, South Yorkshire for magTecta dual face magnetic bearing isolator.
 Angel Technology Ltd of Farnham, Surrey for miniCol – a healthy cheese alternative proven to reduce cholesterol.
 Ardmel Automation Ltd of Glenrothes, Fife for thread-free ultrasonic construction project for the garment industry.
 Atlas Copco Construction & Mining Ltd of Hemel Hempstead, Hertfordshire for cobra two stroke, hand held vibration reduced jack hammers.
 Balcan Engineering Limited of Horncastle, Lincolnshire for waste lamp recycling plant.
 Bells of Lazonby Limited of Penrith, Cumbria for production of quality gluten-, wheat- and dairy-free products.
 Berghaus Limited of Sunderland, Tyne and Wear for design and marketing of outdoor clothing,‘rucsacs’ and footwear.
 Biocolor Ltd of Newtownabbey, County for rapid, easy-to-use, collagen assay.
 Bradley Doublelock Ltd of Bingley, West Yorkshire for auto-reverse hydraulic disc brake system.
 Citation plc of Knutsford, Cheshire Management systems to enable for sMEs to comply with.
 Contact Lens Precision Laboratories Limited (trading as UltraVision CLPL) of Leighton Buzzard, Bedfordshire for SAM and UltraWave technology.
 Doyle & Tratt Products Ltd of Horsham, West Sussex for energy saving and pollution reducing fluorescent lamps, dimmer switches and other decorative electrical accessories.
 ELG Haniel Metals Ltd of Sheffield, South Yorkshire for densified stainless steel scrap.
 e2v Technologies of Chelmsford, Essex for sensors which enable enhanced imaging across all light levels and spectrum.
 EnviroSystems (UK) Ltd of Barton, Preston, Lancashire for envirobed – livestock bedding developed using short fibres from recycled newsprint.
 Exasoft Plc of Coventry, Warwickshire for Mortgage fundamentals - the recalculation/ construction of mortgage accounts.
 FT Technologies Ltd of Teddington, Middlesex for wind and airflow sensors, featuring patented acoustic resonance technology
 Fox Brothers & Co Ltd of Wellington, Somerset for laser scanning of textiles and marketing the archive concept over an e-commerce system to create an in-house design studio.
 Glencairn Crystal Studio Limited of East Kilbride, Glasgow The Glencairn Whisky Glass.
 Greenvale AP Ltd of Chatteris, Cambridgeshire ‘Restrain for system’ for the production and maintenance of a stable atmosphere.
 Hadley Industries plc of Smethwick, West Midlands for ultraSTEEL - a unique method of improving the performance of roll formed metal sections.
 Haldane (UK) Limited of Glenrothes, Fife, Scotland for specialist timber machining.
 Halyard (M & I) Limited of Whaddon, Salisbury, for marine exhaust silencers.
 Hambleside Danelaw Limited of Waterlooville, Hampshire for insulator translucent polyester (GRP) rooflight.
 Kensington Mortgages of London W2 a specialist mortgage lender to those who have difficulty obtaining loans from main providers.
 Lifelines Ltd of Stockbridge, Hampshire for Trackit Ambulatory EEG Recorder.
 MCL Software Ltd of Southport, Merseyside for advanced fraud prevention solutions (HUNTER) for the financial services, insurance, telecommunications and public sector.
 Mmic eod limited of Waterlooville, Hampshire for specialist bespoke engineering for the defence and emergency services market.
 MSA Engineering Systems Limited of Thurmaston, Leicester for CNC wirelaying systems for the manufacture of electrofusion fittings.
 Multimedia Mapping Ltd (trading as Multimap.com) of London EC1 for global on-line mapping and location-based services.
 Precision Polymer Engineering Limited of Blackburn, Lancashire for Perlast G67P perfluoroelastomer – a high performance nano-filled elastomer material.
 Reid Lifting Limited of Chepstow, Monmouthshire, for PORTA-GANTRY lightweight portable gantry system.
 Renishaw plc of Wotton-under-Edge for NC1 and  nC4 non-contact tool setting systems.
 James Robinson Ltd of Huddersfield, West Yorkshire for photochromic molecules for ophthalmic lenses and novel applications.
 Safe and Sound Lighting Limited of Alvechurch, Birmingham for sNAPLITE - recessed downlighter with inbuilt fire and acoustic protection with low air leakage.
 Siemens Communications of Milton Keynes for HiPath personal communications portal.
 Smiths Aerospace - Electronic Systems, Cheltenham of Cheltenham, Gloucestershire for their Remote Interface Unit (RIU) product family – functionally flexible, low-cost ‘building blocks’ for vehicle system architectures.
 Spinnaker International Ltd of Saltash, Cornwall for the iBox cash in transit protection system.
 Tilsatec, a division of Sirdar Spinning Ltd of Wakefield, West Yorkshire for steel reinforced textile materials.
 Timsons Limited of Kettering, Northamptonshire for the ZMR book press for printing books.
 Ulster Carpet Mills (Holdings) Limited of Craigavon, County Armagh, for manufacturing technique for woven carpet.
 Velux Company Ltd of Glenrothes East, Fife, for the Velux design services.
 Waterside Manufacturing Limited (trading as Englands) of Birmingham for safety jackets and vests.
 Whitbybird Ltd of London W1 for multi-disciplinary engineering skills and solutions.
 Wolfson Microelectronics plc of Edinburgh, Scotland for WM9713L - highly integrated audio semiconductor device for advanced multimedia mobile phones.
 E. Wood Limited of Northallerton, North Yorkshire for Copon Hycote 169HB - rapid setting polymeric lining for rehabilitation of drinking water pipelines.

References

Queen's Award for Enterprise: Innovation (Technology)
2006 in the United Kingdom